The following buildings were added to the National Register of Historic Places as part of the Daytona Beach Multiple Property Submission (or MPS).

References

 Volusia County listings at National Register of Historic Places
 Volusia County listings at Florida's Office of Cultural and Historical Programs

 Daytona Beach
National Register of Historic Places Multiple Property Submissions in Florida
Buildings and structures in Daytona Beach, Florida